The Hnidintsivsky oil field is a Ukrainian oil field that was discovered in 1960. It began production in 1961 and produces oil.

References

Oil fields in Ukraine
Oil fields of the Soviet Union